Hassan Town (Punjabi, Shahrak-e-Hassan) is a neighbourhood located within union council 110 (Awan Town) in Iqbal Tehsil of Lahore, Punjab, Pakistan.

Hassan Town enjoys unique advantage that it is on the main Multan Road and Motorway (M2) is just about 5 kilometers and on the other hand the road leads to Karachi (from Thokar Niaz Beg) is only 3 kilometers. This is the home town of Mr. Zia Ur Rahman Baig who is currently living in Putrajaya, Malaysia. 

Iqbal Town, Lahore